Faroese Music Awards (short form: FMA, in Faroese: Føroysku Tónlistavirðislønirnar) is a Faroese music prize award ceremony, which was established in 2014, after the former Faroese music prize Planet Awards was abolished when the producers Portal.fo were sold to new owners. Faroese Music Awards is a cooperation between the Faroese national broadcasting company Kringvarp Føroya, the newspaper Sosialurin, the internet portal In.fo and the Nordic House.

The Faroese Music Awards were presented for the first time on 15 March 2014 in the Nordic House in Tórshavn, where 22 prizes were awarded. The Faroese Music Awards ceremony were also held in 2015, 2016, 2017 and 2018, normally in March of each year. The musical categories were changed after the original FMA event.

The Winners of FMA 2018 
The 2018 FMA show was co-hosted by Rolant Waag Dam and Kristian Blak in the Nordic House.

Best Female singer: Kristina Baerendsen
Best New Artist: Silvurdronger
Best Album: Ingalvur av Reyni
Best Band: Alda Magna
Best Producer: Hans Poulson
Best Album Cover: Kapnas spælir Blak

The Winners of FMA 2017 
The 2017 FMA show was held in the Nordic House on 11 March 2017.

Best Song: "Alright" by  Danny and The Veetos
Best Female singer: Lena Anderssen
Best Male singer: Heiðrik á Heygum
Best Singer/soloist: Eivør Pálsdóttir
Best newcomer: Konni Kass
Best Artist/Band: Danny and The Veetos
Best Artist/Group: ORKA
Best Composition: "Symphony no. 2 – The Earth Anew" – Sunleif Rasmussen
Best Producer: Niclas Johannesen, for producing Eagle In The Sky with Lena Anderssen
Best Album: Eagle In The Sky – Lena Anderssen
Best Album/Concert: At The Heart Of A Selkie – Eivør Pálsdóttir and DR Big Band
Best Song lyrics: "Verð mín", written by Marjun Syderbø Kjælnæs, performed by Eivør Pálsdóttir  on At The Heart Of A Selkie.
Best Music video: "Einaferð var tað eg", GUT Productions – Director: Búi Dam.

The Winners of FMA 2016 
Best Female Singer: Eivør Pálsdóttir
Best Individual singer: Eivør Pálsdóttir
Best Composition:  "Territorial Songs" by Sunleif Rasmussen
Best CD: Territorial Songs by Sunleif Rasmussen
Best Album: Double releases Slør and Bridges by Eivør Pálsdóttir
Best Album Artwork: Slør with Eivør Pálsdóttir

Nominations in 2016

Nominations across the categories

Best producer of the year 
Tróndur Bogason
Bunkarin
Kaj Johannesen
Jákup Zachariassen
Jens L. Thomsen

Best new artist or band of the year 
Alvi Joensen
Elinborg Pálsdóttir
Hamradun
Hulda
Jógvan Joensen
Kátir Kallar
Mahanna
Punjab
Ragnar Finsson

Best music video of the year 
Hamferð - Deyðir varðar
Byrta - Aftur og aftur
Byrta - Andvekur
Brynjolfur - Chain glass
Ranchus – Clog

Nominations of Folk, Country and Blues

Best female or male singer of the year 
Annika Hoydal
Árni Johannesen
Hallur Joensen
Hanus G. Johansen
Sofus Hansen

Best band/artist of the year  
Annika Hoydal
Froðbiar Sóknar Bluesorkestur
Hallur Joensen
Hanus G. & Cantabile
Punjab

Best album of the year 
Endurljós – Annika Hoydal
Heitur kossur – Hanus G. & Cantabile
If the Ocean was Wine – Froðbiar Sóknar Blues Orkestur
Lívið er ein lítil løta – Hallur Joensen
The Flying Elephant – Punjab

Best song of the year 
"Hairy Woman" – Punjab
"Saknur" - Hanus G. & Cantabile
"Kári Kálvalíð" – Hallur Joensen
"Lívið er ein lítil løta" – Hallur Joensen
"Run to You" – Punjab

FMA 2015 

FMA 2015 was held in the Nordic House in Tórshavn on 14 March 2015.

The following artists performed: 
 Greta Svabo Bech
 Yggdrasil
 Xperiment
 Vágaverk
 Týr
 Tollarar Og Syndarar
 Systrar
 Signar í Homrum
 Sakaris
 Quarter To Three
 Hallelujah Sofus
 Dánjal á Neystabø
 AVE
 Alvi Joensen

The Winners of FMA 2015

Pop/Rock category 
 Male singer of the year: Benjamin Petersen.
 Female singer of the year: Greta Svabo Bech.
 Song of the year: Myrkablátt (also known as: Einsamallast í Føroyum), Greta Svabo Bech sings and composed. Elin á Rógvi wrote the text. The song was a part of the radio-advent calendar Nivinaja which Elin á Rógvi wrote.
 Album of the year: Call for a Revolution with HOGNI (Høgni Lisberg)
 Band or artist of the year: AVE

Open  category 
 Best singer or artist of the year: Dávur Juul Magnussen.
 Best band or choir of the year: Yggdrasil
 Best musical composition of the year: Nordisk messe by Sunleif Rasmussen for mixed choir and symphony orchestra.
 Best album or concert of the year: Høvdingar hittast, album by the British composer Gavin Bryars, published in 2014, performed in the Nordic House in Tórshavn in 2011, Eivør Pálsdóttir and Rúni Brattaberg sang at the concert. The music was played by Aldubáran and Eystanljóð.

FMA 2014 

The show was broadcast on the national Faroese radio live.  The hosts were Barbara Holm and Eyðfinn Jensen.
There were also performances by various Faroese artists and bands:
Jóannes Andreasen
Jens Marni Hansen
Marius Ziska
The Absent Silver King
Kári Sverrisson
Hallur Joensen & Kristina Bærendsen
Kamarkórið
Leila av Reyni
Allan Tausen
Reduce to Ash
LoverLover
Døgg Nónsgjógv
Cantabile
Hanus G. Johansen

The winners of FMA 2014

Rock/Metal, Jazz, Blues and Folk category 
Best band of the year: Týr
Best singer of the year: Jón Aldará (lead singer in Hamferð)
Best album of the year: Týr
Best song of the year: Tokan – Marius and Svavar Knútur

Open category 
Best album of the year: Eivør for Lítla Skrímsl
Best artist/band: The Quartet of Betesda (choir)
Best melody: Eivør for Lurta nú

Pop category 
Best male singer of the year: Hallur Joensen
Best female singer of the year: Greta Svabo Bech
Best song of the year: Døgg Nónsgjógv for  the song Tú tók mína hond
Best album of the year: Byrta
Best band/artist of the year: Byrta
Best live band of the year: Swangah

Other prizes 
Best new band of the year: Byrta
Best producer of the year: Baroli Music
Best music video of the year: Greta Svabo Bech for Broken Bones, director: Jamie Quantrill
FMA prize of honour: Simme
Best new thinker of the year: HOYMA (home concerts in Eysturoy) with Jón Tyril and others
Best text of the year: Jóanes Nielsen and Kári Sverrisson for the song Lívið er júst sum tað er (poem by Jóanes Nielsen), which Kári Sverrisson has composed and sung
Best album cover of the year: Týr's Valkyrja

Nominations 2014

Rock/Metal, Jazz, Blues and Folk category

Best singer or artist of the year 
Kári Sverrisson
Jón Aldará
Høgni Lisberg

Best band or artist of the year 
Týr
Hamferð
Kári Sverrisson & Bendar Spónir

Best album of the year 
Valkyrja – Týr
Evst – Hamferð
Nøkur fá fet aftrat – Kári Sverrisson & Bendar Spónir

Best song of the year 
"Stóra lívmóðurin" – Kári Sverrisson & Bendar Spónir
"Tokan" – Marius and Svavar Knútur
"Nation" – Týr

Open category

Best artist or band of the year 
Eivør
Bendar Spónir
Kvartettin í Betesda

Best album of the year 
Motion/Emotion – Sunleif Rasmussen
Skrímslið, lítla systir mín - Eivør
Hvussu bendir man spónir - Bendar Spónir

Best melody/værk 
Lurta nú – Eivør
Motion/Emotion – Sunleif Rasmussen
 – Bendar Spónir

Pop category

Best male singer of the year 
Teitur
Høgni Reistrup
Knút
Jens Marni
Hallur Joensen

Best female singer of the year 
Greta Svabo Bech
Guðrið Hansdóttir
Guðrun Pætursdóttir Háberg
Døgg Nónsgjógv
Laila Carlsen

Best album of the year 
Byrta – Byrta
Story Music – Teitur
Undirgangstónar – Swangah
Áðrenn vit hvørva – Høgni Reistrup
With Stars & Legends – Hallur Joensen

Best song of the year 
"Loyndarmál" – Byrta
"Tú tók mína hond" – Døgg Nónsgjógv
"Shut Up & Sing" – Greta Svabo Bech
"Rock And Roll Band" – Teitur
"Heyah" – Allan Tausen

Best band/artist of the year 
Byrta
Teitur
Greta Svabo Bech
Høgni Reistrup
Swangah

Best upcoming band/artist 
Byrta
Døgg Nónsgjógv
Greta Svabo Bech
The Absent Silver King
LoverLover
Flamma
Allan Tausen
Laila av Reyni
Jákup Lützen

Best music video of the year 
All in – Tú, : Polar Films Entertainment
Lena Anderssen – The Fighter, director: Lene Drachmann
Byrta – Norðlýsið, director: Heiðrik á Heygum
Eivør – True Love, director: Heiðrik á Heygum
Greta Svabo Bech – Broken Bones, director: Jamie Quantrill

References 

Faroese music
Faroese awards
Spring (season) events in the Faroe Islands